Manuela Velasco Díez (born 23 October 1975) is a Spanish actress and television presenter. She is known for playing Ángela Vidal in the horror franchise REC (2007–2014), which won her a Goya Award—Spain's equivalent to the Oscars—among other accolades.

Career
Velasco's first film role was in 1987, as pre-teen Ada in Pedro Almodóvar's comedy-drama thriller Law of Desire.

She gained wide recognition as TV reporter Ángela Vidal in the 2000s found footage horror films REC, REC 2 and REC 4: Apocalypse. She won the Goya Award for Best New Actress for her performance in REC.

In 2005, she hosted Cuatrosfera, by Cuatro.

In 2009, she starred in La chica de ayer, a Spanish adaptation of the UK science fiction series Life on Mars. In 2010, she portrayed Eugenia de Molina, the duchess of Monfragüe in Águila Roja, by TVE.

In 2011, Velasco appeared in the TV series Ángel o demonio. In 2012, she portrayed Ainhoa in Aída.

From 2014 to 2016, Velasco played Cristina Otegui in the TV series Velvet.

In 2016, she played in a theatrical adaptation of the 1994 film Todo es mentira.

In 2017 she appeared in the stage play Bajo terapia alongside Gorka Otxoa, Fele Martínez and Melani Olivares.

Filmography

Television

Film

Television-host

Theater

Awards and nominations

References

External links
 
 
 

1975 births
Living people
People from Vigo
Spanish film actresses
Spanish television actresses
21st-century Spanish actresses